Amos Ekhalie (born 8 July 1988) is a retired Kenyan footballer who played as a midfielder. He also holds Finnish citizenship.

Career

Club career
Ekhalie made his debut for Kenya in a friendly 1–0 win over. He scored the winning goal and Victor Wanyama got the assist Liberia on 15 November 2016.

References

External links

1988 births
Living people
Kenyan footballers
Kenya international footballers
IFK Mariehamn players
Veikkausliiga players
Coast Stars F.C. players
IFK Eskilstuna players
Division 3 (Swedish football) players
Association football midfielders
Kenyan expatriate sportspeople in Finland
Kenyan expatriate sportspeople in Sweden
Expatriate footballers in Finland
Expatriate footballers in Sweden
Finnish people of Kenyan descent
Naturalized citizens of Finland